Joseph Smagorinsky (29 January 1924 – 21 September 2005) was an American meteorologist and the first director of the National Oceanic and Atmospheric Administration (NOAA)'s Geophysical Fluid Dynamics Laboratory (GFDL).

Early life 
Joseph Smagorinsky was born to Nathan Smagorinsky and Dina Azaroff. His parents were from Gomel, Belarus, which they fled during the life-threatening pogroms of the early 20th Century. Nathan and Dina bore three sons in Gomel: Jacob (who died as an infant), Samuel (b. 1903), and David (b. 1907). In 1913, Nathan emigrated from the coast of Finland, passing through Ellis Island and settling on the Lower East Side of Manhattan. Nathan at first was a house painter. Then, with the help of a relative, he opened a paint store. In 1916, with the business established, Dina, Sam, and David emigrated by going to Murmansk and then southward along the Norwegian coast to Christiana (now Oslo) and boarding a boat to New York where they joined Nathan. They had two other children: Hillel (Harry) (b. 1919) and Joseph (b. 1924). 

Like his three brothers, Joseph worked in their father's paint store, which over the years evolved into a hardware and paint store. Sam and Harry stayed in the painting and hardware business, with Harry eventually taking ownership of the original store. As a teenager, David began painting signs for shop owners and subsequently opened a sign painting business. 

Joseph attended Stuyvesant High School for Math and Science in Manhattan. When he expressed an interest in going to college, the family had a meeting in which they discussed the possibility. Sam and David prevailed in their view that Joseph had great promise and deserved the opportunity to go to college.

Education and early career 
Smagorinsky earned his B.S. (1947), M.S. (1948), and Ph.D. (1953) at New York University (NYU). In the middle of his sophomore year at NYU, he entered the Air Force and joined an elite group of cadet recruits, chosen for their talents in mathematics and physics. Those talents led Smagorinsky to be selected for the air force meteorology program. He and other recruits were then sent to Brown University to study mathematics and physics for six months. He was then sent to the Massachusetts Institute of Technology (MIT) to learn dynamical meteorology. His instructor was Ed Lorenz, who later pioneered the mathematical theory of deterministic chaos. During the war Smagorinsky flew in the nose of bombers as a weather observer, making weather forecasts based on visible factors such as the estimated size of waves, and the observed air temperature and wind velocity at the plane's altitude.

Following the war, Smagorinsky concluded his studies. He originally aspired to be a naval architect, but was not admitted to the Webb Institute. He then turned to meteorology as a career and educational focus. As a doctoral student, while serving the remainder of his army commitment, he attended a lecture on weather forecasting conducted by Jule Charney, and asked a series of pointed questions during the question-and-answer session following the talk. Charney, a prominent atmospheric scientist, invited Smagorinsky to the Princeton, NJ Institute for Advanced Study to examine the possible predictability of large-scale motions in the middle troposphere (the lower part of the atmosphere) using the new electronic computer being designed by John von Neumann. 

In April 1950, Smagorinsky participated in a major milestone of modern meteorology; together with Ragnar Fjørtoft, John Freeman, and George Platzman, he worked with Charney to solve Charney's simplest equations on the Electronic Numerical Integrator and Computer (ENIAC). His wife Margaret Smagorinsky (née Knoepfel) was also a member of the team that programmed the ENIAC computer, and was the first woman statistician hired by the Weather Bureau. Von Neumann's new Princeton computer had been delayed so arrangements were made with the Army to use its computer at Aberdeen, Maryland. The results were realistic enough to demonstrate that weather prediction by numerical process was a promising prospect. After the ENIAC work, Smagorinsky moved to the Institute for Advanced Study to work with Charney and von Neumann on the development of a radical new approach to weather forecasting that employed the new technology of the computer.

Before the advent of computers in the late 1940s, weather forecasting was very crude. The American Meteorological Society (AMS) and its leaders, most of whom taught in universities, still aspired to turn meteorology into a professional discipline given the same respect accorded engineering and the other physical sciences. An exceptional mathematician, von Neumann was among the first to see the potential afforded by computers for much faster processing of data and thus more responsive weather forecasting. He was not satisfied with mathematics as an abstract practice. Weather forecasting provided him with a very concrete application of mathematical principles that could exploit the new computer technology. At the Institute for Advanced Study, he used his mathematical knowledge and Smagorinsky worked with Charney to develop a new approach called numerical weather prediction. This approach relied on data collected from weather balloons. The data were then fed into computers and subjected to the laws of physics, enabling forecasts of how turbulence, water, heat, and other factors interacted to produce weather patterns. (Smagorinsky endeared himself to his children by visiting their elementary school classrooms to demonstrate how weather balloons worked.)

In his doctoral dissertation, conducted at NYU under the direction of Bernhard Haurwitz, Smagorinsky developed a new theory for how heat sources and sinks in mid-latitudes, created by the thermal contrast between land and oceans, disturbed the path of the jet stream. This theory provided one of the first applications of Jule Charney's remarkable simplification of the equations of motion for the atmosphere, now known as quasi-geostrophic theory. This work benefited greatly from interactions with Charney at the Institute for Advanced Study. This theory has been elaborated over the years to provide numerous insights into the maintenance of the climate in mid-latitudes and the interaction between the tropics and mid-latitudes.

Leadership of Geophysical Fluid Dynamics Laboratory

Following his apprenticeship and work with von Neumann and Charney, in 1953, at age 29, Smagorinsky accepted a position at the U.S. Weather Bureau and was among the pioneers of the Joint Numerical Weather Prediction Unit. In 1955, at von Neumann's instigation, the U.S. Weather Bureau created a General Circulation Research Section under Smagorinsky's direction. Smagorinsky felt that his charge was to continue with the final step of the von Neumann/Charney computer modeling program: a three-dimensional, global, primitive-equation general circulation model of the atmosphere. The General Circulation Research Section was initially located in Suitland, Maryland, near the Weather Bureau's JNWP unit. The section moved to Washington, D.C. and was renamed the General Circulation Research Laboratory in 1959 and then renamed again as the Geophysical Fluid Dynamics Laboratory (GFDL) in 1963. The lab moved to its current home at Princeton University in 1968. Smagorinsky continued to direct the lab until his retirement in January, 1983.

Smagorinsky's key insight was that the increasing power of computers would allow one to move beyond simulating the evolution of the atmosphere for a few days, as in weather prediction, and move toward the simulation of the Earth's climate. The intention of such simulations is not to predict the detailed evolution of the weather, but by integrating the equations of motion, thermodynamics, and radiative transfer for long enough time periods to simulate the statistics of the weather—the climate—enabling one to study how these statistics were controlled by the atmospheric composition, the character of the Earth's surface, and the circulation of the oceans.

Leading the Geophysical Fluid Dynamics Laboratory 
Among Smagorinsky's many talents was attracting creative scientists to the staff of the GFDL. Two of them were climate modeler Syukuro Manabe in 1959 and ocean modeler Kirk Bryan in 1961, who spearheaded the development of the first climate model in 1969, a general circulation model that was the first approach to take into account the interactions of oceans and atmosphere. Smagorinsky assigned Manabe to the General Circulation Model (GCM) coding and development effort. By 1963, Smagorinsky, Manabe, and their collaborators had completed a nine-level, hemispheric primitive-equation General Circulation Model. Manabe was given a large programming staff and was thus able to focus on mathematical structure of the models, without becoming overly involved in coding. In 1955-56, Smagorinsky collaborated with John von Neumann, Jule Charney, and Norman Phillips to develop a 2-level, zonal hemispheric model using a subset of the primitive equations. Beginning in 1959, he proceeded to develop a nine-level primitive-equation General Circulation Model (still hemispheric). By the end of the next decade, GCMs emerged globally as a central tool in climate research. Other researchers who worked with Smagorinsky in Washington and Princeton included Isidoro Orlanski, Jerry Mahlman, Syukuro Manabe, Yoshio Kurihara, Kikuro Miyakoda, Rod Graham, Leith Holloway, Isaac Held, Garreth Williams, George Philander, and Douglas Lilly.

Development of this first climate model was based on Smagorinsky's belief that individual inquiry would be inadequate for addressing such a complex problem. He realized that it would take large-scale numerical modeling with teams of scientists using commonly shared high-speed computers to achieve such a breakthrough. As stated in the Bulletin of the American Meteorological Society in 1992, "Dr. Smagorinsky's almost relentless pursuit of excellence at Geophysical Fluid Dynamics Laboratory set a standard for other laboratories and centers that have contributed immensely to the growth of meteorology as a science" throughout the world. Michael MacCracken, President of International Association of Meteorology and Atmospheric Sciences, wrote following Smagorinsky's death that "From its earliest days, GFDL has been world renowned, with an outstanding set of scientists doing outstanding work that attracted scientists from around the world to come to learn and collaborate – and then return to their home countries or other institutions as outstanding scientists. Not only a whole new scientific field of investigation, but a community of scientists capable of doing it well has been created."

Smagorinsky invited many scientists from outside the normal circle to provide the broadest perspective on weather forecasts. Very early in his career, he brought pioneering oceanographer Kirk Bryan to GFDL to account for oceanic influences on the weather; and shortly following World War II, with the nation still leery of Japan, he invited Suki Manabe, Yoshio Kurihara, and Kikuro Miyakoda to GFDL, valuing their scientific expertise and potential and ignoring the xenophobia that might have discouraged such international collaboration. He continued this practice of inviting scientists to GFDL who could take on the project of producing a comprehensive theory of atmospheric processes, valuing talent and creativity over what he regarded as irrelevant factors such as field or nationality. Jerry Mahlman, who succeeded Smagorinsky as director of GFDL at Princeton, writes that Smagorinsky "had no real interest in the 'university scientific culture' that still has a tendency to count scientific publications, rather than scientific achievements, as its measure of faculty success. Joe would have none of that. He wanted junior scientists such as us to focus on solving difficult scientific challenges of major relevance to NOAA, the United States, and the world. . . . Without Joe's support and encouragement, would Manabe have written the first paper on the science of global warming in 1967? Would Bryan have produced the world's first ocean model in 1970? Would Manabe and Bryan have produced the world's first coupled atmosphere–ocean model in 1972? Would I have produced the first comprehensive stratospheric dynamical/chemical model? Would Miyakoda have pioneered extended-range weather forecasting? For my research, the answer is: almost certainly not. Without the level of scientific and computational support provided by Joe, these achievements would have required at least another decade of development to achieve success."

Smagorinsky was among the earliest researchers who sought to exploit new methods of numerical weather prediction (NWP) to extend forecasting past one or two days. Smagorinsky published a seminal paper in 1963 on his research using primitive equations of atmospheric dynamics to simulate the atmosphere's circulation. This paper fundamentally changed the approach to modeling climate. He extended early weather models to include variables such as wind, cloud cover, precipitation, atmospheric pressure and radiation emanating from the earth and sun. In order to make these simulations possible, a method was needed to account for atmospheric turbulence that occurred on scales smaller than the model's grid size but still played a crucial role in the atmospheric energy cycle.  With colleagues Douglas Lilly and James Deardorff, both at the National Center for Atmospheric Research (NCAR), he developed one of the first successful approaches to large eddy simulation (e.g., the Smagorinsky-Lilly model), providing a solution to this problem that is still in use, not only in meteorology, but in all fields involving fluid dynamics.

Technical Innovation 
Smagorinsky earned fame for his ability to secure the world's fastest computers for his laboratory time and time again. Many wondered how a single government scientist had such leverage in the highly competitive battle for limited resources. Jerry Mahlman wrote that "Without the level of scientific and computational support provided by Joe, these achievements [global warming, increasingly sophisticated computer models, extended weather forecasting] would have required at least another decade of development to achieve." This remark that Smagorinsky had advanced his field by at least a decade was echoed by several speakers at his memorial.

Influence on global warming research 
In the 1970s, under the direction of Dr. Smagorinsky, scientists at his laboratory devised the first simulations of the response of climate to increasing carbon dioxide in the atmosphere, providing the first modern estimates of climate sensitivity and emphasizing the importance of water vapor feedback and stratospheric cooling.  Scientists at the laboratory also developed the first coupled atmosphere-ocean climate models for studies of global warming, emphasizing the important differences between the "equilibrium" and "transient" responses to increasing carbon dioxide.

International leadership and global impact 
Joseph Smagorinsky's influence and administrative abilities extended well beyond his work at GFDL. He led or contributed to international committees to improve global weather forecasts. Coordinated by the World Meteorological Organization, the efforts led to the first use of satellites to measure temperature and moisture. Tony Hollingsworth of the European Centre for Medium-Range Weather Forecasts (ECMWF) made the point in his remarks at the Princeton lecture after Smagorinsky was presented with the Benjamin Franklin Medal in Earth Science that Smagorinsky's work resulted in saving millions of lives around the world in that severe weather predictions such as hurricanes could alert whole towns to be saved. He reiterated the remark in his letter to GFDL following Smagorinsky's memorial service: "In terms of scientific inspiration and concrete benefits for the protection of human life and society, Joe Smagorinsky has left us a wonderful legacy for which European meteorologists honour and remember him."

Academic career
The year GFDL moved to Princeton, Smagorinsky was named a visiting lecturer with the rank of professor in geological and geophysical sciences at the University. He helped develop the Program in Atmospheric and Oceanic Sciences, a doctoral program in the Department of Geosciences that collaborates closely with the GFDL. Following his retirement as director of the GFDL in 1983, he served as a visiting senior fellow in atmospheric and oceanic sciences at Princeton until 1998. "Dr. Smagorinsky, a major player in the move of the GFDL to Princeton more than 30 years ago, in effect provided Princeton University with a graduate program," said George Philander, a professor of geosciences and director of the Program in Atmospheric and Oceanic Sciences. "It is because of that program, the official link between the GFDL and Princeton University, that Princeton is an internationally recognized center for weather and climate studies, especially studies related to global warming."

Awards and leadership roles 
National Oceanic and Atmospheric Administration recognition as one of the ten most significant figures in NOAA’s history, and identification of his general circulation climate model as one of the three most important breakthroughs in meteorology in the last two centuries.
Benjamin Franklin Medal in Earth Science from the Franklin Institute in Philadelphia in 2003, presented to Smagorinsky and his close friend and colleague Norman A. Phillips for "their seminal and pioneering studies" that led to "an understanding of the general circulation of the atmosphere, including transports of heat and moisture that determine the earth's climate."
Chair, Global Atmospheric Research Program, coordinated by the World Meteorological Organization and the International Council of Scientific Unions
Buys Ballot Gold Medal, 1974 (awarded once each decade by the Royal Netherlands Academy of Arts and Sciences for outstanding advances in the field of meteorology)
International Meteorological Organization Prize and Gold medal, the highest honor accorded by the World Meteorological Organization, 1974
The Clarence Leroy Meisinger Award, given to an individual in recognition of research achievement that is, at least in part, aerological in character and concerns the observation, theory, and modeling of atmospheric motions on all scales. The award is given to young, promising atmospheric scientists who have recently shown outstanding ability and are under 40 years of age when nominated. 1967
Carl-Gustaf Rossby Research Gold medal, presented to individuals on the basis of outstanding contributions to the understanding of the structure or behavior of the atmosphere. It represents the highest honor that the American Meteorological Society can bestow upon an atmospheric scientist.  1972
The Cleveland Abbe Award for Distinguished Service to Atmospheric Sciences by an Individual, presented on the basis of activities that have materially contributed to the progress of the atmospheric sciences or to the application of atmospheric sciences to general, social, economic, or humanitarian welfare. 1980
Presidential award 1980
Symons Memorial Gold Medal, Royal Meteorological Society, 1980
The Scientific Research Society national lecturer from 1983 to 1985
President, American Meteorological Society 1986
International Meteorological Organization Prize from the World Meteorological Organization in 1988
Honorary doctorate, University of Munich
Gold medal, U. S. Department of Commerce
Sigma Xi Society
Fellow of the American Academy of Arts and Sciences
Member of the Presidential Scientific Advisory Committee Panel on Pollution
Member of the National Research Council's Committee on Atmospheric Science

Key publications 
 Smagorinsky, J., 1995: The growth of dynamic meteorology and numerical weather prediction - some personal reflections. In, Canadian Meteorological Memoirs No. 32: Special Symposium on Atmospheric Research in Canada in Honor of Dr. Warren L. Godson's Fifty Years of Public Service,Venkata R. Neralla..[et al.,] eds., 48-56.
 Smagorinsky, J., 1993: Some historical remarks on the use of non-linear viscosities - 1.1 Introductory remarks. In, Large Eddy Simulation of Complex Engineering and Geophysical Flows - Proceedings of an International Workshop in Large Eddy Simulation. Cambridge University Press;  1-34.
 Smagorinsky, J., 1991: Development of international climate research. In, Strategies for Future Climate Research, Mojib Latif, ed., Hamburg: Max-Planck-Institute für Meteorologie;  9-18.
 Smagorinsky, J., 1987: Louis Joseph Battan, 1923-1986 . Bulletin of the American Meteorological Society, 68(4), 370.
 Smagorinsky, J., 1986:  The AMS's continuing role in promoting communications and setting standards. Bulletin of the American Meteorological Society, 67(8), 938.
 Smagorinsky, J., 1986: GARP's objectives in weather prediction: Expectations and realizations. In, International Conference on Results of Global Weather Experiment and Their Implications for World Weather Watch, Vol. I, Geneva, Switzerland, 19-34.
 Smagorinsky, J., 1986: The long range eye of Jerry Namias. In, Namias Symposium - A special symposium in honor of the 75th birthday of Dr. Jerome Namias.   Experimental Climate Forecast Center of Scripps Institution of Oceanography, University of California at San Diego, CA: 63-69.
 Smagorinsky, J., 1986: Review of book: "Prophet--or Professor? The life and work of Lewis Fry Richardson," Oliver M. Ashford, and Adam Hilger. EOS, 67(3), 28.
 Smagorinsky, J.,  1985:  Prospects of atmospheric modelling and its impacts on weather prediction. In, Medium Range Weather Forecasts: The First 10 years, Proceedings of the 10th Anniversary of EMCWF,  97-107.
 Smagorinsky, J., 1984: Review of: "The Global Climate", J. T. Houghton, ed., Cambridge University Press. WMO Bulletin, 33, 361-362.
 Smagorinsky, J., 1983: The beginnings of numerical weather prediction and general circulation modeling: Early recollections. Advances in Geophysics, 25, 3-37.
 Smagorinsky, J., 1983: The Problem of Climate and Climate Variations, World Climate Programme Publication No. WCP-72, WMO. World Meteorological Organization, 14pp.
 Smagorinsky, J., 1982: Jule Charney (1917–1981). Quarterly Journal of the Royal Meteorological Society, 108(455), 267-269.
 Smagorinsky, J., 1982: Scientific basis for the Monsoon Experiment. In,  Proceedings of International Conference on the Scientific Results of the Monsoon Experiment, ICSU/WMO GARP.  35-42.
 Smagorinsky, J., L. Armi, F. P. Bretherton, K. Bryan, R. D. Cess, W. L. Gates, J. Hansen, J. E. Kutzbach, and S. Manabe, et al., 1982: CO2 /Climate Review Panel. In, Carbon Dioxide and Climate: A Second Assessment. Washington, DC: National Academy Press, 1-72.
 Smagorinsky, J., 1981: CO2 and climate - a continuing story. In, Climatic Variations and Variability: Facts and Theories, D. Reidel Publishing Co., 661-687.
 Smagorinsky, J., 1981: Epilogue: a perspective of dynamical meteorology. In, Dynamical Meteorology, New York: Methuen, Inc., 205-219
 Smagorinsky, J., 1981:  Scientific basis for the Monsoon Experiment. In, International Conference on the Scientific Results of the Monsoon Experiment, Oct. 26-30 1981 - Denpasar, Bali, Indonesia.
 Smagorinsky, J., 1981: Some thoughts on contemporary global climatic variability. In, Nature Pleads Not Guilty, An IFIAS Report on the Project on Drought and Man, Vol. 1, R. V. Garcia. New York: Pergamon Press; 265-296.
 Smagorinsky, J., 1980: Climate modelling. In, Proceedings of the Technical Conference on Climate - Asia and Western Pacific, WMO No., 578, World Meteorological Organization (WMO); 139-151.
 Smagorinsky, J., 1978:  History and progress. In, The Global Weather Experiment—Perspective on Its Implementation and Exploitation: A Report of the FGGE Advisory Panel to the U.S. Committee for the Global Atmospheric Research Program (GARP) - National Academy of Science, 4-12.
 Smagorinsky, J., and N. A. Phillips, 1978: Scientific problems of the Global Weather Experiment. In, The Global Weather Experiment, Perspectives on Its Implementation and Exploitation, Report of the FGGE Advisory Panel to the U.S. Committee for the Global Atmospheric Research Program, Assembly of Mathematical and Physical Sciences, National Research Council. National Academy of Science, 13-21.
 Smagorinsky, J., 1972: The general circulation of the atmosphere. In, Meteorological Challenges: A History, Canada: Information Canada, 3-42.
 Smagorinsky, J., 1971:  Numerical simulation of climate modification. In, Proceedings of the 12th Interagency Conference on Climate Modification, Virginia Beach,  VA, 221-226.
 Manabe, S., J. Smagorinsky, J. L. Holloway Jr., and H. M. Stone, 1970: Simulated climatology of a general circulation model with a hydrologic cycle, III. Effects of increased horizontal computational resolution. Monthly Weather Review, 98(3), 175-212. .
 Smagorinsky, J., 1970: Numerical simulation of the global atmosphere. In, The Global Circulation of the Atmosphere, G. A. Corby, Editor, London, England: Royal Meteorological Society,  24-41.
 Smagorinsky, J., 1969: Problems and data needs of global atmospheric models for the 1970s. In, First USCG National Data Buoy Systems Scientific Advisory Meeting, U.S. Coast Guard Academy,  16-26.
 Smagorinsky, J., 1969: Problems and promises of deterministic extended range forecasting. Bulletin of the American Meteorological Society, 50(5), 286-311.
 Manabe, S., and J. Smagorinsky, 1967: Simulated climatology of a general circulation model with a hydrologic cycle II. Analysis of the tropical atmosphere. Monthly Weather Review, 95(4), 155-169.
 Smagorinsky, J., 1967: The role of numerical modeling. Bulletin of the American Meteorological Society, 48(2), 89-93.
 Smagorinsky, J., 1966: Remarks on mathematical models. In, IBM Scientific Computing Symposium on the Environmental Sciences, Session 5 - Mathematical models, 241-244.
 Manabe, S., J. Smagorinsky, and R. F. Strickler, 1965: Simulated climatology of a general circulation model with a hydrologic cycle. Monthly Weather Review, 93(12), 769-798.
 Smagorinsky, J., 1965: Numerical simulation of the atmosphere's general circulation. In, Large-scale Problems in Physics, IBM Scientific Computing Symposium, Yorktown Heights, NY: 141-144.
 Smagorinsky, J., 1965: Remarks on data processing in meteorology. In, Proceedings of the WMO/IUGG Symposium on Meteorological Data Processing, Brussels, Belgium, WMO Technical Note 73, pp. 1–2.
 Smagorinsky, J., 1965: Review of book: "An introduction to the hydrodynamic methods of short period forecasting", by I. A. Kibel. Mathematics of Computation, 19(89), 162-163.
 Smagorinsky, J., S. Manabe, and J. L. Holloway Jr., 1965: Numerical results from a nine-level general circulation model of the atmosphere. Monthly Weather Review, 93(12), 727-768. 
 Smagorinsky, J., R. F. Strickler, W. E. Sangster, S. Manabe, J. L. Holloway, and G. D. Hembree, 1965: Prediction experiments with a general circulation model. In, Proceedings of IAMAP/WMO International Symposium - Dynamics of Large-scale Processes, Moscow, Russia. 70-134.
 Smagorinsky, J., 1964: Implications of dynamical modelling of the general circulation on long-range forecasting. In, WMO-IUGG Symposium on Research and Development Aspects of Long-range Forecasting, Boulder, CO., WMO Technical Note 62, 131-137.
 Smagorinsky, J., 1964: Some aspects of the general circulation. Quarterly Journal of the Royal Meteorological Society, 90(383), 1-14.
 Smagorinsky, J., 1963: General Circulation experiments with the primitive equations I. The basic experiment. Monthly Weather Review, 91(3), 99-164.
 Smagorinsky, J., 1963: Remarks on geophysical fluid dynamics. Bulletin of the American Meteorological Society,  44, 28-34.
 Smagorinsky, J., 1962: Numerical weather analysis and prediction, by Phillip D. Thompson. Mathematics of Computation, 16(80), 503-505.
 Smagorinsky, J., 1960: General circulation experiments with the primitive equations as a function of the parameters. In, International Association of Meteorology and Atmospheric Physics, XIIth General Assembly, Publication IAMAP No. 12/a, Helsinki, Finland, 22-23.
 Smagorinsky, J., 1960: On the application of numerical methods to the solution of systems of partial differential equations arising in meteorology. In, Frontiers of Numerical Mathematics, A Symposium Conducted by the Mathematics Research Center, United States Army and National Bureau of Standards. University of Wisconsin Press; 107-125.
 Smagorinsky, J., 1960: On the dynamical prediction of large-scale condensation by numerical methods. In, Physics of Precipitation, 5, AGU Monograph. Washington, DC: American Geophysical Union, 71-78.
 Smagorinsky, J., 1960:  A primitive equation model including condensation processes. In, Proceedings of International Symposium on Numerical Weather Predictions, Japan Meteorological Society, 555.
 Smagorinsky, J., 1958: On the numerical integration of the primitive equations of motion for baroclinic flow in a closed region. Monthly Weather Review, 86(12), 457-466.
 Eliassen, A., J. S. Sawyer, and J. Smagorinsky, 1957: Upper air network requirements for numerical weather prediction. WMO Technical Note No. 29. Geneva, CH: WMO, 90 pp.
 Smagorinsky, J., 1956:  On the inclusion of moist adiabatic processes in numerical prediction models. In, Bericht des Deutschen Wetterdienstes, Nr. 38, 82-90.
 Smagorinsky, J., 1955: A synopsis of research on quasi-stationary perturbations of the mean zonal circulation caused by topography and heating. In, Dynamics of Climate: The Proceedings of a Conference on the Application of Numerical Integration Techniques to the Problem of the General Circulation held October 26–28, 1955. New York, NY: Pergamon Press, 44-49.
 Smagorinsky, J., 1955: On the numerical prediction of precipitation. Monthly Weather Review, 83(3), 53-68.
 Smagorinsky, J., 1953: Data Processing requirements for the purposes of numerical weather prediction. In, Proceedings of the Eastern Joint Computer Conference, Washington, DC, 22-30.
 Smagorinsky, J., 1953: The dynamical influence of large-scale heat sources and sinks on the quasi-stationary mean motions of the atmosphere. Quarterly Journal of the Royal Meteorological Society, 79, 342-366.

Family life 
Smagorinsky was married to Margaret Frances Elizabeth Knoepfel from May 29, 1948 to his death at age 81 on September 21, 2005. They met while taking classes at New York University, where Margaret was preparing for a career as a meteorological statistician. Margaret soon became the Weather Bureau's first female statistician. The couple had two wedding ceremonies. One was a Catholic ceremony at Margaret's mother's insistence; the other was a civil ceremony in the Georgetown garden of Judge Fay Bently. (Judge Bently was later removed from the bench, declared incompetent, and confined to a mental hospital.) This ceremony was attended only by the required 2 witnesses, Jerry Moss and Margaret's sister Alice Williams. Joseph and Margaret considered this smaller gathering to be their official wedding, given the ways in which his Jewish family and her Catholic family opposed the union. Following their marriage, Margaret chose to stay at home and raise their five children, Anne, Peter, Teresa, Julia, and Frederick. Margaret wrote several pamphlets featuring traditions at Princeton University, including:
The Regalia of Princeton University
Some Legends & Lore of Princeton University 
The Tigers of Princeton University

At the memorial gathering at Guyot Hall, Princeton University in October, 2005, following Smagorinsky's September death, he was honored with the following story of his life, sung to the tune of Ervin Drake's "It Was a Very Good Year":

His beloved wife Margaret died on November 14, 2011 and was buried with him in Princeton Cemetery. On December 29, 2011, a memorial service was held for Margaret Smagorinsky at the Nassau Inn in Princeton, at which many of Smagorinsky's colleagues and their wives honored her role as "mother hen" of GFDL during his tenure as founder and Director.

References

External links 
Joseph Smagorinsky: Visionary in Numerical Weather Prediction and Climate Modeling. Web pages recognizing Smagorinsky as one of NOAA's Top Ten History Makers
Pioneering meteorologist Smagorinsky dies Princeton University obituary
Weather By Numbers Mr. Wizard Studios feature on numerical weather prediction, highlighting Smagorinsky's work.
American Institute of Physics 1986 interview 1986 interview with Smagorinsky on the status of the field.
Oral History Transcript — Dr. Joseph Smagorinsky 
  Interview With Professor J. Smagorinsky

1924 births
2005 deaths
American meteorologists
American civil servants
Stuyvesant High School alumni
New York University alumni
National Oceanic and Atmospheric Administration personnel
United States Air Force airmen
Department of Commerce Gold Medal
Recipients of the Buys Ballot Medal (Netherlands)
Carl-Gustaf Rossby Research Medal recipients
American people of Belarusian-Jewish descent
People from New York City
Burials at Princeton Cemetery